Alkanindiges hongkongensis is a gram-negative, aerobic, nonmotile bacterium of the genus Alkanindiges, which was isolated from the parotid abscess of a patient.

References

External links
Type strain of Alkanindiges hongkongensis at BacDive -  the Bacterial Diversity Metadatabase

Moraxellaceae